Garmeh (also known as Garmāb) is a village in Nakhlestan Rural District, in the Central District of Khur and Biabanak County, Isfahan Province, Iran. At the 2006 census, its population was 244, in 69 families.

The native language of Garmeh is Garmei. Together with Khuri, Farvi, and Iraji, it is classified as a variety of Baiabanaki, which is a distinct subgroup of Western Iranian languages.

References 

Populated places in Khur and Biabanak County